Ho Sposato Uno Sbirro is an Italian police detective series, which ran from 2008 to 2010 on Rai 1. It stars Flavio Insinna as police commissioner Diego Santamaria.

Plot 
The show mostly revolves around murders and the police inspectors, but also deals with Diego's personal family life. Stella, who not only is one of Diego's inspectors, but is his wife as well, is played by German-born actress Christiane Filangieri. Then, you also have the parents of the couple. Diego's overbearing mom, Herminia, is played by veteran actress Giovanna Ralli, and Stella's snobbish mom, Clarissa, played by veteran actress, Barbara Bouchet During the first season, 6 episodes have been filmed. In the pilot episode, Diego and Stella meet, fall in love, and get married. In the third episode, Stella thinks she's pregnant, and Diego goes into panic mode. And in the season finale, Stella leaves Diego after catching him having an affair with his ex-girlfriend. This is a very crucial episode. Stella gets hit by a car, ends up in a coma, and Diego's by her bedside, begging her to wake up. When she finally regains consciousness, she forgives him and tells him some shocking news. 

In September 2010, the second season of "Ho Sposato Uno Sbirro" premiered on RaiUno in Italy, and on its international channel, RaiItalia, a month later, in other parts of the world. Even though, it was filmed almost 3 years ago, the story where Season 1 ended, picks up at the beginning of Season 2. Stella's about ready to give birth to her and Diego's first child, and they're trying to get to the hospital. Later, Diego's surprised to find out he's the father of twin girls. Diego's very supportive of taking care of the babies, as long as he's not working. In the fourth episode, "Una Piccola Sorpresa", Diego and his inspector receive a hot tip about the hideout of a murder suspect. Instead of finding him, they find his young son, Nikola, hiding in the closet. Diego convinces Nikola to come with him to the police station, where he takes a liking to Lorenza, (played by Luisa Corna) the police psychologist and Diego's ex-wife. The most poignant scene in this episode is when Nikola's told that his father has been arrested and will be in jail for a long time. Diego, Stella and Lorenza take Nikola to a home for foster kids, where Diego and Nikola have a very emotional goodbye.

Cast 

Flavio Insinna as Diego Santamaria
Christiane Filangieri as Stella Morini
Luisa Corna as  Lorenza Alfieri
Antonio Catania as  Giuseppe Lojacono
Barbara Bouchet as  Clarissa Morini
Giovanna Ralli as  Erminia Santamaria
Paolo Buglioni as  Ramazza
Marco Bocci as  Simone Ardea 
Giulietta Revel as Rosa Liguori 
Serena Rossi as  Barbara Castello 
Francesco Arca as  Antonio Branca 
Luca Calvani as  Giovanni Vattoli
Daniel Emilio Baldock as Ernest

See also
List of Italian television series

References

External links
 

Italian comedy television series
Italian crime television series
2008 Italian television series debuts
2010 Italian television series endings
2000s Italian television series
2010s Italian television series
RAI original programming